Benilde may refer to:

 Saint Bénilde Romançon

Two educational institutions named after this man:

 St. Benilde School
 Benilde-St. Margaret's School
 De La Salle–College of Saint Benilde